Borophagina is a subtribe of the Borophaginae, a group of extinct canids.

Like some other borophagines, they were short-faced, heavy-jawed canids although the group included both omnivorous and hypercarnivorous species.

References

 
Zanclean extinctions
Animal subtribes